ConfDesigner is a graphical environment written in Java, which eases the design of complex system configurations.

Because of being part of the Sphinx4 Speech Recognizer, ConfDesigner is licensed under BSD licenses. ConfDesigner is based on the Netbeans Graph Library.

WebStart

The best way to get in touch with ConfDesigner is to  check out its sources. It is located in $SPHINX_ROOT/tools/confdesigner.

Nevertheless, ConfDesigner can be used without any installation using Java Webstart. Although only Java5 or higher is required to run the application locally, Java6 or higher is required to run it via Webstart.

Component Categories

In order to add a Configurable to one or several arbitrary categories, it's just necessary to annotate the class (or one of its parent-classes, or one of its implementing interfaces, or one of the interfaces being implemented by one of its parent classes. E.g.

@ConfCategory(value = {"search", "parallel"})
class ParallelSearchDecoder implements Configurable{
...
}

In ConfDesigner the categories are used to set up another component-selection-tree (beside the usual package-based one)

Release history

Planned

 improved node-layout
 snap2grid
 level of details for nodes in order to speed up the application
 distributed computing support

In Process (upcoming Beta3)

 copy, cut, paste  & delete for subgraphs
 optional snap2grid
 reimplementation of property panel (in order to support default properties and non-defined properties)
 improved connection routing
 better node-layout

Beta2

 ConfDesigner can be started directly via "java -jar confdesigner.jar" (because of added jar-Manifest)
 Command line interface
 Automatic range checking for basic properties (int, double, string) based on the property-annotations
 quick-search: find nodes within a system configuration graph
 tab-support: edit several system configurations within on designer-instance
 project-support: bundle sets of system configurations
 User-defined component-categories (to use them, just annotate the class with the ConfCategory-annotation).
 Image-exporting of configuration-graphs
 Various usability improvements (improved key bindings, fit-to-view, linking this website into the help-menu)
 Background Labels, which are intended to help to get some additional structure into a system graph
 fixed: deletion of models and connections
 fixed: rerouting of connections

Beta1
 Supports all current Sphinx4 property types (including arbitrary large component lists)
 Loads and saves Sphinx4-configuration files
 In place editing of component names
 Automatic graph layouting
 Graph serialization
 Automatic class path parsing in order to find all available Configurables
 Completely instantiation free modeling
 System instantiation and evaluation directly within the designer, including online configuration changes

Known Issues

 The CTRL-key needs to be pressed for zooming and in order to connect nodes which is confusing and not necessary

Integrated development environments